The Greens–Left of the Peoples (LV–IP) was a Spanish electoral list in the European Parliament election in 1999 made up from green and left-wing peripheral nationalist parties.

Composition

Electoral performance

European Parliament

References

Defunct political party alliances in Spain
Regionalist parties in Spain